Sohel Rana (born 18 June 1996) is a Bangladeshi cricketer. He made his Twenty20 debut for Uttara Sporting Club in the 2018–19 Dhaka Premier Division Twenty20 Cricket League on 26 February 2019. He made his List A debut for Uttara Sporting Club in the 2018–19 Dhaka Premier Division Cricket League on 23 March 2019. He made his first-class debut on 26 October 2022, for Rangpur Division in the 2022–23 National Cricket League.

References

External links
 

1996 births
Living people
Bangladeshi cricketers
Rangpur Division cricketers
Uttara Sporting Club cricketers
Place of birth missing (living people)